Parnay may refer to the following places in France:

Parnay, Cher, a commune in the department of Cher
Parnay, Maine-et-Loire, a commune in the department of Maine-et-Loire